Usha Sirohi (born 1 January 1952) is an Indian politician from Bharatiya Janata Party who served as Member of 17th Uttar Pradesh Assembly (March 2017–March 2022) from Bulandshahr Assembly constituency. She is the widow of Virendra Singh Sirohi. She married him on 7 June 1971. In 2020 by-poll election, she received 86,879 votes and defeated Mohammad Yunus, with a margin of 21,702 votes.

References 

Indian women in politics
1952 births
Living people